Lula Pena (born May 15, 1974) is a Portuguese fado singer, composer and poet from Lisbon, Portugal.

Biography 

As well as fado ("phado" as she prefers), Pena's music is strongly influenced by a range of other types of music, including chanson, flamenco and blues, as well as music from Mexico, Greece and Italy. Lula Pena says her approach to music is “wandering borderless and intuitively through different languages and sounds”. She performed at WOMEX 14 Official Showcase Selection of World Music Expo in October 2014.

Pena appeared at the WOMAD festival in 2016.

Discography 
 Phados (1998)
 Troubadour (2010)
 Archivo Pittoresco (2017)

References

External links 
 Lula Pena on Facebook
 Lula Pena on Last.fm

1974 births
21st-century Portuguese women singers
People from Lisbon
Living people